Gerda Munck (2 January 1901 – 24 December 1986) was a Danish fencer. She competed in the women's individual foil event at the 1932 Summer Olympics.

References

External links
 

1901 births
1986 deaths
Danish female foil fencers
Olympic fencers of Denmark
Fencers at the 1932 Summer Olympics
People from Kolding
Sportspeople from the Region of Southern Denmark